Rhipinllwyd (or Rhippinllwyd) is a hamlet in the  community of Beulah, Ceredigion, Wales, which is 69.3 miles (111.5 km) from Cardiff and 190.7 miles (307 km) from London. Rhippinllwyd is represented in the Senedd by Elin Jones (Plaid Cymru) and is part of the Ceredigion constituency in the House of Commons.

References

See also
List of localities in Wales by population 

Villages in Ceredigion

cy:Rippinllwyd